The 2001 FIA GT Jarama 500 km was the tenth round the 2001 FIA GT Championship season.  It took place at the Circuito Permanente Del Jarama, Spain, on September 30, 2001.

Official results
Class winners in bold.  Cars failing to complete 70% of winner's distance marked as Not Classified (NC).

Statistics
 Pole position – #7 Larbre Compétition Chéreau – 1:32.630
 Fastest lap – #7 Larbre Compétition Chéreau – 1:32.399
 Average speed – 141.440 km/h

References

 
 

J
Jarama 500